Bašaid is a village located in the Kikinda municipality, in the North Banat District of the Republic of Serbia. It is situated in the Autonomous Province of Vojvodina. The village has an ethnic Serb majority (89.15%) and a population of 3,503 (2002 census). Administratively, the settlement of Bikač is also classified as part of Bašaid.

Ethnic groups (2002 census)

Serbs = 3,123 (89.15%)
Romani = 179 (5.11%)
Hungarians = 100 (2.86%)
Yugoslavs = 23 (0.66%)
Macedonians = 12 (0.34%)
others.

Historical population

1961: 4,367
1971: 3,982
1981: 3,864
1991: 3,741
2002: 3,503

References
Slobodan Ćurčić, Broj stanovnika Vojvodine, Novi Sad, 1996.

See also
List of places in Serbia
List of cities, towns and villages in Vojvodina
Bikač

Kikinda
Populated places in Serbian Banat